Laška Vas is a settlement in the hills southeast of Laško in eastern Slovenia. The area is part of the traditional region of Styria. It is now included with the rest of the Municipality of Laško in the Savinja Statistical Region.

References

External links
Laška Vas on Geopedia

Populated places in the Municipality of Laško